Rudy Currence, also known as early 2000s R&B act "Rudy", is an American singer, songwriter, producer, and keyboardist, best known for co-writing "Sophisticated Lady" for Mya's album Moodring, Grammy-nominated "Sunday A.M" for Karen Clark Sheard's 2015 album Destined to Win, and his 2020 Gospel single "I Belong Here" that peaked at #1 on the Billboard Gospel Airplay Chart.  Trained in classical and jazz piano, Currence recently secured an endorsement deal with Kawai Musical Instruments.

Discography
Studio projects
 More Than You'll Ever Know (2003)
 Here With You (2006)
 Digital Analog (2016)

Singles

Guest appearances

Songwriting, keyboard and production credits

Credits are courtesy of Discogs, Tidal, and AllMusic.

Awards and nominations

References 

21st-century American singers
21st-century American male singers
African-American songwriters
Year of birth missing (living people)
Living people